Donkervoort D8 is a series of ultra-light weight sports cars manufactured by Dutch car manufacturer Donkervoort in Lelystad, Netherlands since 1993. They have been produced in several variants, starting with the original Donkervoort D8 Zetec (1993-1999), which used engines made by Ford; since 1999 the cars have used engines built by German automobile manufacturer Audi.

Models

Ford engines (1993–99)

The Donkervoort D8 Zetec Classic replaced the Donkervoort S8AT in 1993; while the S8AT used a turbocharged OHC 2.0L Ford engine, the D8 Zetec used the recently-introduced Ford Zetec engine (1.8L and 2.0L Zeta engines). In 1994, the Zetec Sport was introduced, with weight reduced by swapping some metal body parts for carbon fibre, downsizing the battery, and replacing the cast iron clutch housing with an aluminum equivalent. Externally, the Classic can be distinguished by the traditional long front fenders which extend from the front wheel to the forward edge of the doors, while the Sport is equipped with cycle fenders covering just the front wheels.

The Donkervoort D8 Cosworth was introduced in 1995, available in both Classic and Sport models. The Cosworth can be distinguished from the Zetec by the number and arrangement of vents in the bonnet.

Audi engines (1999–2012)

Donkervoort D8 Audi (1999-2003) and D8 (E-gas) Wide Track (2004-2012) followed the Zetec-engined cars. The D8 Sport received an uprated  version of Audi's turbocharged 1.8-liter engine that year.

The chassis of the Audi models was new, using lessons learned from the D20 project. Styling of the D8 with Audi engines followed that of the D8 Cosworth Sport, with minor changes to distinguish the former until the Wide Track model received a new nose and front light arrangement along with a wider stance.

The D8 270 was the seventh fastest production car on the Nordschleife in 2011, with a lap time of 7:14.9. The 270 can be distinguished from lower-powered models by the shape of the nose and front grille, which was revised to accommodate a larger cooler and extra radiator on the side.

The first Donkervoort hardtop, the D8 GT, was introduced in 2007 at the Geneva Motor Show. Weight increase over the regular D8 cabriolet is minimized by extensive use of carbon fibre in the roof, rear end, doors, and fenders. Production of GT models was limited to 50 examples per year starting from 2008.

GTO (2013–present)

Donkervoort announced the next-generation D8 GTO in December 2011, which was larger and slightly heavier than earlier D8 models. All GTOs are powered by the five-cylinder 2.5T 20v Audi R5 engine.

The D8 GTO models include the Donkervoort D8 GTO (2013-2021), D8 GTO Premium (2013), D8 GTO Bilster Berg Edition (2014-2015) and the D8 GTO RS (2016-2021). In 2015 the all-carbon fiber GTO Bare Naked Carbon (BNCE) appeared. In 2019 a special edition, Donkervoort D8 GTO-JD70, was created, followed by the Donkervoort D8 GTO-JD70 R the next year, in honor of founder Joop Donkervoort's 70th birthday.

Donkervoort released the Donkervoort D8 GTO Individual Series in September 2021 which offers the ability to customize the vehicle to the client's exact specifications. Donkervoort claims that the only limit is what's legal in the European Union. It also marks the end of D8 production. The starting price is €162,900 but the final price depends on the customizations chosen. Donkervoort released the Donkervoort D8 GTO Individual Series in the US in July 2022; it was the first Donkervoort officially released in the US with a starting price of US$240,000 and the first example was delivered to a buyer in Florida. Two others were shipped to clients in California and Colorado.

References

Cars introduced in 1993
D8